Agave gracilipes, common names Maguey de pastizal or slimfoot century plant, is a plant species native to western Texas, southern New Mexico and Chihuahua.

Agave gracilipes is not as large as some other species in the genus.

References

gracilipes
Flora of the Chihuahuan Desert
Flora of Chihuahua (state)
Flora of New Mexico
Flora of Texas